Marco Mancosu (born 22 August 1988) is an Italian professional footballer who plays as a midfielder for  club Cagliari.

Club career

Cagliari
Born in Cagliari, Sardinia, Mancosu started his career with hometown club Cagliari Calcio and made his first team debut in the last round of 2006–07 season, also scoring a goal in his first top-flight appearance, and then made 10 first team appearances in the following 2007–08 season.

He joined Serie B side Rimini Calcio on loan for the 2008–09 season in order to gain more first team experience. He joined Empoli on loan on 10 August 2009.

Siracusa
On 13 August 2010, it was confirmed that Mancosu was sold to Lega Pro Prima Divisione side U.S. Siracusa, on a co-ownership deal. The Sicilian club, recently underwent a second consecutive promotion from the Serie D in 2008 to the Lega Pro Prima Divisione this season.

In June 2011, Cagliari bought back Mancosu from the co-owner.

In August 2011, he returned to Siracusa on a season-long loan deal. Mancosu was a key person for Siracusa successful campaign which was the first before the winter break.

Benevento
In 2012, he moved to Benevento, where he spent two years.

Casertana
In 2014, he was signed by Casertana, where he spent two seasons.

Lecce
In July 2016 he joined Lecce. He made his debut with the giallorossi side on 30 July 2016, in a 2–1 home win against AltoVicentino in the Coppa Italia. He was a regular starter for the team in Lega Pro during the 2016–17 and 2017–18 seasons. On 27 August 2018 he scored in an away fixture against Benevento, in his first Serie B game in eight years. In January 2019, he was named the team's new captain, as his predecessor, Franco Lepore, had recently been sold by the club.

Return to Cagliari
On 17 August 2022, Mancosu's contract with SPAL was terminated by mutual consent. On the next day, Mancosu signed a two-year contract with Cagliari.

International career
On 12 August 2009, he made his debut with the Italy under-21 team in a friendly game against Russia. Mancosu played all 5 matches of 2005 UEFA European Under-17 Football Championship and all 3 matches of 2005 FIFA U-17 World Championship.

Personal life
Mancosu has two brothers who are also professional footballers, the elder Matteo and the youngest Marcello. In May 2021, Mancosu revealed that an operation that he had earlier in the year in March was to remove a tumour and on 26 May 2021 Mancosu was declared free of cancer.

Career Statistics

References

External links
AIC Profile 
FIGC Profile 

1988 births
Living people
Sportspeople from Cagliari
Association football midfielders
Italian footballers
Italy under-21 international footballers
Italy youth international footballers
Cagliari Calcio players
Rimini F.C. 1912 players
Empoli F.C. players
U.S. Lecce players
Serie A players
Serie B players
Serie C players
Footballers from Sardinia